Shi Yuxiao (11 April 1933 – 12 February 2005) was a general (shangjiang) of the People's Liberation Army (PLA). He was a member of the 13th and 14th Central Committee of the Chinese Communist Party. He was a member of the Standing Committee of the 9th National People's Congress and a delegate to the 10th National People's Congress.

Biography

He enlisted in the People's Liberation Army (PLA) in July 1949, and joined the Chinese Communist Party (CCP) in November 1953. During the Chinese Civil War, he served in the First Field Army and engaged in the Battle of Lanzhou. In February 1952, he went to the Korean battlefield to participate in the Korean War and returned to China in September 1958. 
In 1984, he was political commissioner of the 1st Group Army, for which he led the troops to control 28 enemy strongholds, annihilated more than 5,200 enemy people, destroyed 128 artillery, 65 military vehicles, and seized 112 guns of various types. In June 1985, he became deputy political commissioner of the Nanjing Military Region, rising to political commissioner in April 1990. During his term in office, he led the troops to impose martial law in Beijing during the 1989 Tiananmen Square protests and massacre. He became political commissioner of the Guangzhou Military Region in November 1992, and served until August 1998. In March 1998, he was made vice chairperson of the National People's Congress Financial and Economic Committee. In 1998, the Yangtze River flood, he led the troops to participate in the flood relief operations.

On 12 February 2005, he died of an illness in Guangzhou, Guangdong, at the age of 71.

He was promoted to the rank of lieutenant general (zhongjiang) in September 1988 and general (shangjiang) in May 1994.

References

1933 births
2005 deaths
People from Baoji
Central Party School of the Chinese Communist Party alumni
People's Liberation Army generals from Shaanxi
People's Republic of China politicians from Shaanxi
Chinese Communist Party politicians from Shaanxi
Members of the 13th Central Committee of the Chinese Communist Party
Members of the 14th Central Committee of the Chinese Communist Party
Members of the 9th Chinese People's Political Consultative Conference
Delegates to the 10th National People's Congress